Public bus Services were introduced in Abu Dhabi by the Emirate in 2008 with four routes, which charged zero fare until the end of the year.
Since 2010, There are also numerous Regional routes operating from the Abu Dhabi CBD to areas extending outside the city, e.g. Yas Island (Route 290).

The Transportation Services in Abu Dhabi are operated by MAN Lion's City and MAN Lion's Regio Buses. The Lion's Regio services are specifically used for Regional Routes and are charged at AED 2.

Routes
Abu Dhabi City bus services as of May 2021:

5	Marina Mall via Al Zahiyah to Al Falah/Sheikh Zayed bin Sultan Street
7	Marina Mall via Al Zahiyah to Al Falah/Sheikh Zayed bin Sultan Street
008	Fish Market via Al Khalidiyah to Zayed Port	
009	Al Marina via Passport Road to Al Mina New Souq	
010	Ras Al Akhdar via Passport Road &  Najda Street & Hamdan Street to Al Mina Center	
011	Al Marina via Passport Road to Al Mina Fishermen Association	
032	Al Marina via Electra Road to Al Maqta'a West
034	Ras Al Akhdar via Corniche Road & Electra Street to Zayed Sports City Abu Dhabi Courts
040	Al Marryah Sowwah Square via Electra Road to khalifa Park South
044	Al Mina Fishermen Association via Electra Road to Officers Club
052	Al Marryah Sowwah Square via Electra Road & Muroor road to Zayed  Sport City\Abu Dhabi Courts
054	Al Mina Fish Market via Hamdan Street & Airport Road to Umm Al Naar Petroleum Institute
056	Al Mina Souq via Electra Road & Muroor Road to Khalifa Park
063	Al Marina via Corniche Road & Najda Street to Al Reem Sun Gate
411    Baniyas West Bus Station via Shabia M11, M10, M9 and NPCC to Mussafah Industrial Port

The detailed maps for these routes are available online.

Competitors
There exist cheap, private, although illegal alternatives in the form of private taxis and minibuses.

The only other buses are those running between Emirates.  These buses are owned by the governments of the individual Emirates.

Fares and payment
The current fare system in Abu Dhabi uses a contactless card for the fare collection system called Hafilat Card that launched on May 15, 2015. All buses use the Hafilat Card and charge a flat fare of AED 2 within Abu Dhabi City limits while trips to suburbs cost an additional 5 fils per kilometre (Example: Mussafah to Abu Dhabi city cost AED 4). Hafilat Cards are available for daily, weekly, and monthly users, with special fares levied for senior citizens and students.

Bus stops

Boarding and alighting are only permitted at designated bus stops, which are located throughout the island. The bus stops are located relatively close to each other.

Local culture

As with most buses in the UAE, the front rows of seats (2 rows of 4 facing sideways) are priority seating for ladies.  Males occupying those seats are required to give up their seats in the event of a lady standing.

References

External links
 Abu Dhabi Public Transport Buses

2008 establishments in the United Arab Emirates
Bus service
Bus transport in the United Arab Emirates